Michel Guilavogui (born 12 December 1993) is a Guinean footballer who most recently played for the Rochester Rhinos in United Soccer League.

Career
Guilavogui signed with United Soccer League side Rochester Rhinos from Boavista FC (Cape Verde) on 14 May 2016. He made his debut the same day in a 0–0 draw with the Charlotte Independence. At the end of the 2016 season, Guilavogui was not one of the ten players listed as under contract for the following season.

References

External links

1993 births
Living people
Guinean footballers
Guinean expatriate footballers
Rochester New York FC players
Association football midfielders
Expatriate soccer players in the United States
USL Championship players